Centar Župa is a municipality in the western part of North Macedonia. Centar Župa is also the name of the village where the municipal seat is found. Centar Župa Municipality is part of the Southwestern Statistical Region.

History
After the Ottoman conquest in 1448, Kodžadžik was settled by Ottoman soldiers and Turkish nomads (Yörüks). The local church was converted to a mosque, and Kodžadžik, as part of the sanjak (district) Debra-i Bala, became a center that connected the southeast with Albania and the Adriatic Sea.

When North Macedonia proclaimed its independence in 1991, the Macedonian state implemented nationalist politics, which aimed to assimilate Macedonian Muslims into a broader category of "Macedonians". The government banned education in Turkish in all regions to "prevent Turkification". This, however, was met with resistance by Muslims who did not support the association and wanted to learn Turkish and continue their education in Turkish. The protests failed, although one person applied to the European Court of Human Rights. The case revolved around rights to education in the mother tongue.

Geography
The municipality borders Struga Municipality to the south, Debar Municipality to the east, north and west, and Albania to the west.

Demographics 
Mothers tongues in the municipality include (2021):
Turkish: 2,209 (59.4%)
Macedonian: 962 (25.9%)
Persons for whom data are taken from administrative sources: 324 (9.5%)
Albanian: 192 (5.2%)
Others: 3 (0.1%)

References

External links
 Official website

 
Southwestern Statistical Region
Municipalities of North Macedonia